
Gmina Osiecznica is a rural gmina (administrative district) in Bolesławiec County, Lower Silesian Voivodeship, in south-western Poland.

Neighbouring gminas
Gmina Osiecznica is bordered by the gminas of Bolesławiec, Iłowa, Małomice, Nowogrodziec, Szprotawa, Węgliniec and Żagań.

Villages
The gmina contains the villages of Bronowiec, Długokąty, Jelenie Rogi, Jeziory, Kliczków, Ławszowa, Luboszów, Ołobok, Osiecznica, Osieczów, Parowa, Poświętne, Przejęsław, Świętoszów and Tomisław.

References

Osiecznica
Bolesławiec County